Quigley Stadium is a stadium in West Haven, Connecticut, United States.  It was originally built in 1947 from surplus bleachers that were once installed on flat bed light rail cars and towed alongside the Yale crew team as they competed off of nearby Orange Avenue. Maurice P. Quigley purchased these surplus bleachers off the rail cars and had them hauled approximately 1 mile to the current site which gave the field a capacity of 2,000 people. It opened on June 20, 1947.  It was originally called Exhibition Stadium but subsequently renamed for Maurice P. Quigley, who built the ballpark and owned the semi-professional West Haven Sailors who played there, as well as Ship's Tavern in West Haven, a popular hangout among sports fans.  Quigley sold the ballpark to the Town of West Haven in 1951.

It is primarily used for baseball and was home to the West Haven Yankees and West Haven A's.  The bleachers were razed in 1987. It is the current home of the Notre Dame (West Haven) High School baseball team and West Haven Twilight League amateur baseball league.

References

External links
Ballpark Reviews: Quigley Stadium
Digital Ballparks: Quigley Stadium

Baseball venues in Connecticut
Minor league baseball venues
Buildings and structures in West Haven, Connecticut
Sports venues in New Haven County, Connecticut
1947 establishments in Connecticut
Sports venues completed in 1947
Defunct baseball venues in the United States
Defunct minor league baseball venues